"Gene Hive" is a science fiction short story  by English author Brian Aldiss. It was first published, as "Journey to the Interior", in 1958 in Nebula Science Fiction #30 and first collected, as "Gene-Hive", in The Canopy of Time (Faber and Faber, 1959) 

The story has a scientific approach to the theme of gene-shifting and genetic engineering. It  anticipates the central idea of Richard Dawkins' The Selfish Gene (1976) by nearly two decades:

References

External links 

Science fiction short stories
Works originally published in Nebula Science Fiction
1958 short stories